Jamie Salter (born 1962/1963) is a Canadian billionaire businessman. He is the founder, chairman and CEO of Authentic Brands Group, an American brand development and licensing company in New York City. Prior to his time at Authentic Brands Group, he was the CEO of Hilco Consumer Capital.

Early life
Salter is a native of Toronto. Salter attended high school in California and then studied business at Long Beach State University, before transferring to Carleton University in Ottawa, Canada.

Career
He began his career marketing sporting goods in the 1980s. In 1992, he co-founded the snowboard manufacturer Ride Inc. which became publicly traded on the Nasdaq in 1994. Salter stepped down as the company CEO in 1996. Salter worked with several other sporting good ventures prior to joining his next major venture, Hilco Consumer Capital.

Salter is the co-founder of Hilco Consumer Capital, the private equity unit of Hilco Trading LLC, which he helped start in December 2006. He left Hilco in 2010 to start his own company, Authentic Brands Group. The company acquires rights to brand names and owns the rights to dead celebrities such as Marilyn Monroe, Michael Jackson, Muhammad Ali and Elvis Presley. Within six years, he grew it into a $1.5 billion company and earned a reputation as a brand expert.

In November 2021, after a funding round valued the company at $9.5 billion, Salter's net worth was estimated at US$1.1 billion.

Personal life
Salter has four sons, who all work for ABG. His son, Corey Salter is the chief operating officer.

He lives in a luxury condo building in the Chelsea district of New York City, and has a holiday home in Muskoka, Ontario.

References 

Living people
Canadian businesspeople
Year of birth missing (living people)
Canadian billionaires
1960s births